Anderson Andrés Julio Santos (born 31 May 1996) is an Ecuadorian professional footballer who plays for Major League Soccer club Real Salt Lake. Currently married to Alison Lara (Ecuadorian), two kids.

Club career
He began his career with L.D.U. Quito in 2016.

Real Salt Lake
Julio was loaned to the Major League Soccer side Real Salt Lake on 12 March 2021. He scored a brace in his debut for the club on 24 April 2021, in a 2-1 road win against Minnesota United. San Luis and Real Salt Lake came to an agreement on a transfer and Julio joined the Major League Soccer side full time on 28 April 2022, signing a three-year deal.

Career statistics

Honours
LDU Quito
Ecuadorian Serie A: 2018
Copa Ecuador: 2019

References

1996 births
People from Pimampiro Canton
Living people
Association football midfielders
Ecuadorian footballers
L.D.U. Quito footballers
Atlético San Luis footballers
Real Salt Lake players
Ecuadorian Serie A players
Liga MX players
Major League Soccer players
Ecuadorian expatriate footballers
Expatriate footballers in Mexico
Ecuadorian expatriate sportspeople in Mexico
Expatriate soccer players in the United States
Ecuadorian expatriate sportspeople in the United States